Buckland in the parish of Braunton, North Devon, England, is an ancient historic estate purchased in 1319 by Godfrey II de Incledene of Incledon, the adjoining estate about 1/2 mile to the north-west, whose family (later Incledon), is first recorded in 1160. It is situated half a  mile north-west of St Brannock's Church in Braunton. Buckland House, a grade II* listed mansion remodelled in the 18th century, is still occupied in 2014 by descendants of the Incledon-Webber family, formerly prominent in the political and commercial life of nearby Barnstaple and North Devon. The owner of the estate in 1937, William Beare Incledon-Webber (born 1872) was also lord of the manor of nearby Croyde and Putsborough.

Ownership
According to Vivian (1895), the first recorded member of the family was Robert de Incledon, living in 1160. The Book of Fees (probably 13th century) lists Incledene as held from the Honour of Barnstaple by "Nicholas de Ferariis" (Ferrers) and "Robert de Incledene". The property passed through the Incledon family until the death of John VII Incledon (1702-1746), of Buckland; his only son John Incledon (1741-1741) died an infant, leaving two daughters as his co-heiresses. The elder daughter, Mary (1736-1802), married in 1759 Philip Rogers Webber (1732-1819), JP and DL for Devon;  their descendants still own the property.

Sources
Burke's Genealogical and Heraldic History of the Landed Gentry, 15th Edition, ed. Pirie-Gordon, H., London, 1937, pp. 2390–1, pedigree of Incledon-Webber of Buckland
Vivian, Lt.Col. J.L., (Ed.) The Visitations of the County of Devon: Comprising the Heralds' Visitations of 1531, 1564 & 1620, Exeter, 1895, pp. 497–9, pedigree of Incledon of Buckland

References

Historic estates in Devon
Braunton
Incledon family residences